The Proud Rebel is a 1958 American Technicolor Western film directed by Michael Curtiz, with a screenplay by Joseph Petracca and Lillie Hayward that was based on a story by James Edward Grant. It is the story of a widowed Confederate veteran and his mute son who struggle to make a new life among sometimes hostile neighbors in the Midwest. Despite the implications of the title, the main character in "The Proud Rebel" does not dwell much on his Southern past, but finds his life complicated by sectional prejudice.

The film stars Alan Ladd, Olivia de Havilland, Dean Jagger, David Ladd and Cecil Kellaway and features Harry Dean Stanton (credited as Dean Stanton) in an early film appearance.

Plot
A former Confederate soldier, John Chandler (Alan Ladd) has come to an Illinois town with his 10-year-old son David (David Ladd) to see Dr. Enos Davis (Cecil Kellaway). The boy was struck mute after witnessing his mother's death in a fire, and hasn't spoken a word since. Dr. Davis recommends an operation by a doctor he knows in Minnesota.

In the street outside Dr. Davis' office, John has his and David's expertly trained dog, Lance, clear the road of a flock of sheep being herded through town. The sheep belong to rancher Harry Burleigh (Dean Jagger) and his sons, Jeb (Harry Dean Stanton) and Tom (Tom Pittman), who try to steal the dog. John fights them while a passing stranger, Linnett Moore (Olivia de Havilland), keeps David safe and out of the way. Harry knocks out John, pours whiskey on him, then tells the sheriff about being attacked by a drunk.

John must pay $30 or serve 30 days in jail. Linnett intervenes, suggesting to the sheriff that Chandler can work off the debt on her farm. In exchange she offers to cover the fine, so that he will be released. John disagrees at first, but is won over by her decency. Over the course of time, he discovers that Linnett is being pressured by the overbearing Burleigh to sell her land. It transpires that her land is blocking the easy passage of his sheep to pasture and the railroad. Gradually, John and Linnett grow closer, despite John being determined to remain aloof, knowing he and his son will leave soon.

A trip to Minnesota for treatment is expensive but John won't accept offers for the valuable dog; David loves the animal but, after he is taunted for his muteness and roughed up by local children, John decides to sell Lance after all to finance the trip. He asks Linnett to accompany the boy up north while he rebuilds her barn, burned down by the Burleighs' men in an attempt to pressure Linnett to sell.

The operation doesn't work, and David is devastated to return home and find the dog is no longer theirs. John goes to the Burleighs to try to get Lance back and finds he is being mistreated. Harry gives the dog back, but has his sons prepared to shoot John as a thief. The boy shouts out to save his father's life. In the end, John shoots Harry and his older son, then returns to Linnett with the dog and David, who is now able to speak.

Cast
 Alan Ladd as John Chandler
 Olivia de Havilland as Linnett Moore
 Dean Jagger as Harry Burleigh
 David Ladd as David Chandler
 Cecil Kellaway as Dr. Enos Davis (Quaker)
 James Westerfield as Birm Bates
 Dean Stanton as Jeb Burleigh
 Thomas Pittman as Tom Burleigh
 Henry Hull as Judge Morley
 Eli Mintz as Mr. Gorman
 John Carradine as Traveling Salesman
 King as Lance, David's Dog
Uncredited
 Percy Helton as Photographer
 Dan White as Court Clerk
 Mary Wickes as Mrs. Ainsley

Production
The film was based on a 1947 short story by James Edward Grant. Film rights were bought by Sam Goldwyn who gave them to his son in 1950. Goldwyn Jr. said the film would be about his favourite kind of story, "the theme of the undefeated man." He announced the project would be filmed in 1955 based on a script by Joseph Petracca. However it ended up taking him a few years to source financing.

Goldwyn Jr. had budgeted the project at $1.6 million but had trouble securing financing over $1 million. He decided not to compromise and go for the larger budget without having sold it to a distributor. Goldwyn Jr.:
I really had no other choice. To me it was very important that this story be filmed as I thought it should be done or not at all. I suddenly realised that if I couldn't do it the way I saw it, I wouldn't be an independent producer. I was able to borrow $1,200,000 from the Bank of America – my father signed the loan with me – and I put up the rest of the money.
Alan Ladd signed to co-star with his son David under the direction of Michael Curtiz. Goldwyn Jr said "Michael Curtiz has drawn fine performances from both of them. The boy, when I first spoke to him, was stiff and frightened, but when I started talking to him about his father, his face lighted up and I knew he was right for the part."

Adolphe Menjou was meant to play a supporting role but pulled out.

The movie was shot in Cedar City, Utah. Its external scenes depicting the U.S.Midwest—a flat and well-vegetated landscape, are a bit jarring to compare to Utah's arid, hilly and mountainous backdrop.

Once the movie was completed, Goldwyn Jr. showed it to distributors and succeeded in securing deals with Buena Vista for the U.S. and Loews internationally.

Critical reception
A contemporary review in Variety described the film as a "suspenseful and fast-action post-Civil War yarn" with "characterizations that hold forth most strongly, topped perhaps by the very appealing performance of David Ladd." Critic A.H. Weiler wrote in The New York Times that the film was "a genuinely sentimental but often moving drama" and an "honestly heartwarming drama" that "is more concerned with exposing character than mayhem." While praising the performances, the review also notes that "A viewer might justifiably observe that the tale is spun somewhat unevenly, that it slows down on a few occasions and that the 'happy ending' is telegraphed. But these [...] are minor matters." A review in TV Guide described the film as a "warm-hearted story" with "[b]rilliant performances (especially David Ladd's) and the unusual characterization of de Havilland's hardened, loner widow" and "fine color photography of the Utah landscape."

Trivia
The Proud Rebel influenced the famous Indian artist Kishore Kumar, who remade it as Door Gagan Ki Chhaon Mein in 1964 starring his real-life son Amit Kumar playing the role of the mute son.

See also
 List of American films of 1958

References

External links
 
 
 
 
Review of film at New York Times

1958 films
1958 Western (genre) films
1950s English-language films
Films directed by Michael Curtiz
Films scored by Jerome Moross
Films set in the 1860s
American Western (genre) films
1950s American films